Pietro Parente (16 February 1891 in Casalnuovo Monterotaro, Italy – 29 December 1986 in Vatican City) was a long-serving theologian in the Holy Office of the Roman Catholic Church, and was made a cardinal on 26 June 1967. At his peak he was regarded as one of the foremost Italian theologians.

Life

Parente began his education at the Metropolitan seminary of Benevento in the 1900s and soon moved to Rome to study. His ability as a theologian was very well known even before he was ordained in 1916, and immediately after ordination he became a seminary rector in Naples, a role he was to hold for a decade, after which Parente transferred to the prestigious Pontifical Lateran University and briefly from 1934 to 1938 to the Pontifical Urbanian Athenaeum. Parente then went back to Naples to found the Faculty of Theology and Canon Law in his former seminary, and he was again rector from 1940 to 1955.

During this period of seminary teaching, Parente wrote frequently for the Vatican newspaper L’Osservatore Romano. He gained a reputation for his strongly worded, almost blunt, style of communicating official Church doctrine - something for which he is remembered by almost all those who studied under him. He was the first writer to use the term New Theology to describe the writings of Marie-Dominique Chenu and Louis Charlier in that paper in 1942, and was influential behind the encyclical Humani generis that condemned those theologians eight years later. He was the assessor of most of the cases done by the Holy Office during these years and knew Pope Pius XII personally.

Bishop
Parente was archbishop of Perugia from 1955 to 1959, when Pope John XXIII made him one of the highest-ranking officials of the Holy Office. When this was renamed the Congregation for the Doctrine of the Faith in 1965, Parente became secretary, but he was viewed by Paul VI as too outspoken in personality to be given the job of prefect - which was given to the lesser-known but friendly and tactful Yugoslav Franjo Šeper. Parente was elevated to the cardinalate on 26 June 1967, ceasing thereupon to be Secretary of the Congregation, since that post, subordinate to that of Prefect, could not be held by a cardinal.

Although his knowledge and ability was still seen as very valuable in later years, Parente's days as one of the foremost theologians in the Vatican had largely gone by the time he became a cardinal. He was originally highly dubious about the Vatican rehabilitating Galileo during the Vatican Council, but was less opposed to it by the time Pope John Paul II officially did so in 1979, and he spoke at the age of 91 on the 1700th anniversary of the conversion of Armenia to Christianity in an effort to unite the Roman and Armenian Churches. 

His age disqualified him from participating in the papal conclaves of 1978.

When he died in 1986, he was the oldest living cardinal, seven weeks shy of his ninety-sixth birthday.

Parente and Pius XII

Parente, who is rumored to have assisted Pope Pius XII in preparing the encyclical Humani generis, wrote in Filosofia e teologia di Pio XII (Vaticano 1967) about the magisterium of Pius XII, which he characterized as firm without any bending of eternal truth in favour of popular beliefs in his days. Pius XII demands respects for he achievements of the past, but also openness for the questions of our time. He rejects theological relativism, which would reduce the Christian faith to grass, bent by the winds of time. At the same time, he demands adaptation of existing teachings to the language of the time. The magisterium of the papacy is according to Parente, of divine and not human origin. He used the papacy not only to teach the truth but also to bring together all Christians separated from the Holy Roman Catholic Church, but not by reducing basic the truth entrusted to the Church.

Pius XII according to Parente, set firm pointers in mariology  (Munificentissimus Deus and Fulgens corona), liturgy (Mediator Dei), the definition of the Church, (Mystici corporis), biblical exegesis (Divino afflante Spiritu), and, the application of papal infallibility  (with the Dogma of the Assumption). But, according to Parente, Pope Pius added to all these firm positions caveats, which allow adaptations at a later time, modifications but never radical deviations. Thus, the theology is both conservative and progressive. Parente states that Pius XII predicted the crisis of theology which did follow his pontificate after Vatican II. This crisis, so Parente, cannot be overcome, by going back to the theology or Canon Law of 1918. It will be overcome with a compromise between conservativism and progressivism, maintaining the doctrinal basics and utilizing new language and culture. According to him, Pope Pius XII created the methodological apparatus for such a synthesis.

References

External links
 Biography

Parente, Pietro Cardinal
Parente, Pietro Cardinal
Parente, Pietro Cardinal
Pope Pius XII advisers
Participants in the Second Vatican Council
20th-century Italian Roman Catholic theologians
Italian male writers
Members of the Congregation for the Doctrine of the Faith
Cardinals created by Pope Paul VI
Rectors of the Pontificio Collegio Urbano de Propaganda Fide